Volleyball at the 2019 South Asian Games is being held in  Kathmandu, Nepal from 27 November to 3 December 2019.

Medalists

Draw

Men

Group A
 
 
 (Host)

Group B

Women

Group A
 
 
 (Host)

Group B

References

External links
Official website

2019 South Asian Games
Events at the 2019 South Asian Games
2019
South Asian Games
Volleyball in Nepal